Oscar Humphries (born 23 April 1981) is an Australian fine art and design dealer and journalist. 

He was editor of Press Holdings art magazine Apollo from 2010 until 2013.

Since 2000, he has written on a variety of subjects including art and design for British newspapers and magazines, including The Sunday Times and Tatler. In 2007 Humphries was made a contributing editor of The Spectator and was the launch editor of The Spectator Australia in 2008.

As director of Sebastian + Barquet London he curated shows on Carlo Mollino, Paolo Venini and Rick Owens. As head of international sales for Timothy Taylor Gallery he curated "The Tightrope Walker" with Emma Dexter. In 2016, he curated the exhibition 'Albers & the Bauhaus', examining the artist's pre-war output in the context of the work of his peers.

Personal life 
Born in Sydney, the son of the satirist Barry Humphries and his third wife, the surrealist painter Diane Millstead and he was educated at Bryanston School and Stowe School.
In 2018 he married Sophie Oakley; the couple have two children.

References

External links 
 Official Oscar Humphries website
 The Spectator contributions

Living people
1981 births
Journalists from Sydney
Australian editors
Australian art dealers
British male journalists
British editors
Art dealers from London
People educated at The Hall School, Hampstead